Gustavo Adolfo Luiz Dodt da Cunha Barroso (December 29, 1888 – December 3, 1959) was a Brazilian lawyer, writer and politician associated with Brazilian Integralism and antisemitism. He was also known by the pseudonym João do Norte. Being considered a master of Brazilian folklore, he was the first director of the National Historical Museum and one of the leaders of the Brazilian Integralist Action, being one of its most prominent ideologists.

He is considered the most anti-Semitic Brazilian intellectual, whose ideas were close to those of Nazi theorists. Barroso wrote that he did not agree with Hitler's anti-Semitism and justified his attacks on Jews with an alleged fight against racism. As he himself put it:

Biography

Early life

Barroso was born in Fortaleza, son of Antônio Filinto Barroso and Ana Dodt Barroso, he studied at day schools São José, Partenon Cearense and Liceu do Ceará. He studied at the Faculty of Law of Ceará linked to the Federal University of Ceará (UFC), graduating in 1911 from the Faculty of Law of Rio de Janeiro, currently the National Faculty of Law of the Federal University of Rio de Janeiro (UFRJ). He was half German by birth, his mother coming from Württemberg.

Later years and antisemitism
Barroso made his name as a journalist and was for a time involved with the socialist Clube Maximo Gorki. However his politics became more conservative after he secured his law degree in Rio de Janeiro in 1910.

He soon became an important figure in Ceará state, serving variously as Secretary of the Interior and Justice, and being elected a Representative in the National Congress. He even formed part of the Brazilian delegation to the Paris Peace Conference of 1919. He would later rise to hold such positions as president of the Academia Brasileira de Letras (Brazilian Academy of Letters) and secretary-general of the International Committee of Legal Advisers.

In 1933, Barroso joined the Brazilian Integralist Action, which had fascist characteristics. He soon became the head of the extreme anti-Jewish faction within the Brazilian Integralist Action. Noted for his hard-line antisemitism, he took charge of the group's militia from 1934 to 1936 before being appointed to the party's Supreme Council. An extensive writer, his polemical works at this time included many anti-semitic books and newspaper articles in Fon-Fon and Século XX magazines.

Political differences caused Barroso to be regarded as dangerous by the more constitutionally minded Integralista party's leader, Plínio Salgado, who  suspended him from collaborating for six months with the party's newspaper, A Ofensiva. However Barroso continued to pursue his antisemitic ideals, translating The Protocols of the Elders of Zion into Portuguese and even suggesting setting up concentration camps.

Following the formation of the Estado Novo dictatorship of Getúlio Vargas (1938–1945), Barroso  was arrested in 1938 after the Brazilian Integralist Action attempted a violent coup d´etat. However Barroso was never tried due to a lack of evidence of his involvement in the attempted coup. He subsequently left political activism and became largely accepting of Getúlio Vargas later constitutional government (1951–1954), serving as a special ambassador to Uruguay (1952) and Peru (1954). He died in Rio de Janeiro, aged 70.

He was mentioned as a relevant intellectual in a publication that lists extreme-right activists from the whole world. A museum in Fortaleza, his home town, the Museu Gustavo Barroso, bears his name.

Works 
A keen Folklorist, Barroso built up a collection of exhibits relating to Brazil's past at the National Historical Museum (Portuguese: Museu Histórico Nacional) in Rio de Janeiro and produced around 50 non-political books including historical and regional novels, folklore studies and biographies of Brazilian national military heroes such as General Osório and Admiral Tamandaré.

As a novelist, he produced the work "Terra do Sol" (1912), which demonstrated his admiration for the people of northeastern Brazil's rural areas. Barroso was often linked with the neorealist school of Brazilian literature, although he differed from the neorealism typified by the likes of Erico Verissimo, Amando Fontes and Telmo Vergara by his emphasis on rural rather than urban settings. Barroso belonged to the regionalist documentary strand of Brazilian neorealism, although, along with Mário Sete, he rejected the inherent modernism in the works of contemporaries in the genre such as Jorge Luis de Rêgo and Jorge Amado.

He also published a few works on Lampião, besides the aforementioned "Terra do Sol", also "Herois e Bandidos" (1917) and "Alma de Lama e de Aço"(1928).

As a political writer, his polemical works when joined to the Brazilian Integralist Action included "O Liceu do Ceará", "Brasil: Colônia de Banqueiros" and "História Secreta do Brasil". He also translated The Protocols of the Elders of Zion into Portuguese.

As Brazil had relatively few Jews by then, Barroso's anti-semitic writings tended to focus on the international conspiracy theory of Jewish world control, as espoused notably in his book "The Paulista Synagogue".

References

Bibliography
 
 
 
 
 

1888 births
1957 deaths
Far-right politics in Brazil
Brazilian diplomats
Brazilian essayists
Ambassadors of Brazil to Uruguay
Ambassadors of Brazil to Peru
Brazilian Integralist Action politicians
Brazilian fascists
Brazilian journalists
Brazilian monarchists
Male journalists
20th-century Brazilian lawyers
Brazilian ethnographers
Brazilian male novelists
People from Fortaleza
Antisemitism in Brazil
Protocols of the Elders of Zion
Brazilian people of German descent
Members of the Chamber of Deputies (Brazil) from Ceará
20th-century Brazilian novelists
20th-century Brazilian male writers
20th-century journalists